Scopula obliquiscripta is a moth of the  family Geometridae. It is found in South Africa.

References

Endemic moths of South Africa
Moths described in 1897
obliquiscripta
Moths of Africa